Ken Ring (born January 29, 1979) is a Swedish rap artist.

Career
He was born in Hässelby, a suburb west of Stockholm, Sweden. Ken wrote the song "Mamma" about his mother becoming ill and dying of cancer when he was 13 years old; it was his breakthrough song, released in 1999. He released his first studio album later that year, entitled Vägen tillbaka, with the hit single "Eld och djupa vatten". After a show on "Vattenfestivalen" in Stockholm later in 1999, Ken Ring got arrested for performing the song called "Spräng regeringen" in which he rapped about rushing the Royal Palace in Stockholm and raping Princess Madeleine.

Because of this controversy Ken's record label ended their cooperation with the rapper, in the year 2000, however, before parting ways, Ken managed to release his second studio album Mitt hem blir ditt hem, through the same label. After that album was released, Ken Ring became what is known as an underground rapper, being unable to find a willing record label. He continued releasing songs on the internet.

In 2004, Ken Ring started a collaboration with Norwegian producer Tommy Tee. The collaboration was successful, and they released the album Två legender utan pengar (Two Legends Without Money) together, in 2004.

Ken Ring has collaborated with rappers and producers Tommy Tee, Saigon, Heltah Skeltah, Morgan Heritage, Kalamashaka, and many others. Along with Proof and Swift from D12, Ken helped in the production of rap group Smif-n-Wessun's self-titled album. Ken has released 9 studio albums so far. He has 3 grammy nominations and has performed more than 950 shows worldwide. Ken has 4 children in Sweden. Using his connections with many members of the hip-hop "game", Ken is building a large studio in Kenya and is planning to take over the African hip hop industry, according to his own claims. He has also been in a few, low-budget films, including  "Blodsbröder". He was an extra in the Swedish TV-show Rederiet, in 1995. He is currently writing his first movie script.
He is also the owner of a newly started football club called "K.R.A.C.K UNITED", located in the coastal region of Kenya. He has stated the goal for this being to sell players to the European market in the future. The team has done very well and is now the best youth team of the south coast.

During 2013, Ken Ring participated in the TV-show Så mycket bättre where he regained a lot of media attention after being "kept in the dark" for so long due to his controversy. Since January 2014, Ken Ring has been signed to the "Orlando John Agency", a talent agency owned by Wyclef Jean's manager.

On April 12, 2021 Ken announced his retirement from music on a LinkedIn post.

Discography

Albums 
Charting

Others
 Vägen tillbaka (1999)
 Mitt hem blir ditt hem (2000)
 Mellanspelet (2002)
 InblicKEN (2003)
 Det bortglömda (2003)
 2 legender utan pengar (with Tommy Tee; 2004)
 KENnelklubben (2004)
 RubriKEN (2005)
 Äntligen hemma (2007)
 Hip Hop (2009) (see table above)
 AkustiKen (2013) (see table above)

Singles 
Charting

Other singles
 "Gatuslang" (1998)
 "Tidiga demor" (1999)
 "Stockholm stad" (1999)
 "Stockholm stad 12"" (1999)
 "Mamma" (1999)
 "Eld och djupa vatten" (1999)
 "Dödens gränsland" (1999)
 "Vill inte veta" (2000)
 "Grabbarna från förorten" (2000)
 "Situation Stockholm" (2000)
 "Mitt hem blir ditt hem" (2000)
 "BB berättelsen" (featuring Tommy Tee) (2004)
 "Måste seja hei" (featuring Tommy Tee) (2004)
 "Cutta dom" (2006)
 "På väg hem (EP; 2006)
 "Det hände något på vägen hem" (EP; 2006)
 "Snart hemma" (EP; 2007)
 "Ta det lugnt" (2007)
 "Kelian" (2007)
 "STHLM CITY" (2008)
 "Hip Hop" (2009) 
 "Helt Jävla Beng" (2010)
 "Plocka Han" (feat. Tommy tee and M.O.P) (2011)

Mixtapes 
 "165 - Various Mixtapes" (1997)
 "165 - Unreleased Joints Vol. 1" (1999)
 "165 Allstars Vol. 1" (2000)
 "Ken Ring & BB Inc Kaddo Presents: Soundclap Vol. 1" (2005)
 "Ken Ring & BB Inc Kaddo Presents: Soundclap Vol. 2" (2005)
 "Ken Ring & BB Inc Kaddo Presents: Soundclap Vol. 3 (Svensk Hiphop Special)" (2005)
 "Ken Ring & BB Inc Kaddo Presents: Soundclap Vol. 4" (2005)
 "Ken Ring & BB Inc Kaddo Presents: Soundclap Vol. 5 (Hosted by Sam-E)" (2005)
 "Ken Ring & BB Inc Kaddo Presents: Soundclap Vol. 6 (XXX-special. Hosted by Bingo Rimér & Pernilla Lundberg)" (2006)
 "Shu Bre Express - Mixtape Vol. 1" (2008)
 "Mixtape "10"" (2009)
 "SommarbänKEN" (2009)
 "Kiprono" (2010)

See also
Swedish hip hop

References

Notes

External links
Official Website

1979 births
Living people
Swedish rappers
Swedish people of Kenyan descent